The 1889 Newfoundland general election was held on 6 November 1889 to elect members of the 16th General Assembly of Newfoundland in Newfoundland Colony. The Reform Party administration of Robert Thorburn was defeated in favour of the Liberal Party led by William Whiteway formed the government. Reform soon disappeared and was replaced by the Orange Order based Tory Party. This was the first general election held in Newfoundland using the secret ballot.

Results by party

Elected members

 Bay de Verde
 Edward White Liberal
 Henry J. B. Woods Liberal
 Bonavista Bay
 Donald Morison Reform
 Samuel Blandford Liberal
 Alfred B. Morine Reform
 Burgeo-LaPoile
 James Murray Independent
 Burin
 Edward Rothwell Liberal
 James S. Winter Conservative in 1892
 James S. Tait Liberal
 Carbonear
 William Duff Liberal
 Ferryland
 George Shea Independent
 Daniel Joseph Greene Independent
 Fogo
 James Rolls Reform
 Fortune Bay
 John Studdy Liberal
 Harbour Grace
 William H. Whiteley Liberal
 Eli Dawe Liberal
 Harbour Main
 Frank J. Morris Liberal
 William Woodford Liberal
 Placentia and St. Mary's
 George Emerson Liberal (speaker)
 Richard O'Dwyer Liberal
 James McGrath Liberal
 Port de Grave
 James A. Clift Liberal
 St. Barbe
 George C. Fearn Liberal
 St. George's
 Michael H. Carty Liberal
 St. John's East
 Thomas J. Murphy Liberal
 John J. Dearin Liberal
 Jeremiah Halleran Liberal
 St. John's West
 Edward P. Morris Liberal
 James Day Liberal
 Lawrence Gearin Liberal
 Trinity Bay
 William Whiteway Liberal
 Robert Bond Liberal
 Twillingate
 Edward P. Burgess Liberal
 Jabez P. Thompson Liberal
 Thomas Peyton Liberal

References 
 

1889
1889 elections in North America
1889 elections in Canada
Pre-Confederation Newfoundland
1889 in Newfoundland
November 1889 events